The Isar  is a river in Tyrol, Austria, and Bavaria, Germany, which is not navigable for watercraft above raft size. Its source is in the Karwendel range of the Alps in Tyrol; it enters Germany near Mittenwald and flows through Bad Tölz, Munich, and Landshut before reaching the Danube near Deggendorf. At  in length, it is the fourth largest river in Bavaria, after the Danube, Inn, and Main. It is Germany's second most important tributary of the Danube after the Inn.

Etymology

One theory is that the name Isar comes from the hypothetical Indo-European root *es or *is, which generally meant "flowing water" and later turned into a word with a meaning narrowed to frozen water (hence English ice) in Proto-Germanic; the name itself is mentioned for the first time in 763 as Isura. An older theory is that it comes from Celtic words and the name Isar is a construction of the Celtic stems ys "fast, torrential" and ura "water, river". According to another interpretation ys may mean "high" as well as "low", referring to the rapidly changing water level in the river Isar. In the ancient settlement area of the Celts several related river names can be found:

Eisack / Isarco (Italy)
Ésera (Spain)
Isar (Spanish town, in the province of Burgos)
Isauro / Foglia (Italy)
Isère (France)
Isel (Austria)
IJssel (Netherlands; known to Romans as Isala)
IJzer/Yser (Belgium)
Isonzo (Italy)
Jizera (Czech Republic)

It may be possible that the ancient name of the lower part of the river Danube, Ister, has the same source. Newer interpretations relate it to the Proto-Basque particle *(w)its-, "water", also seen in similar but otherwise unexplained river names, such as Vézère, Vizela, Weser and Vistula.

Geography

The Isar drains a substantial part of the Alps and parts of the Karwendel mountains northeast towards the Danube river and thus finally towards the Black Sea. Apart from the larger tributaries Amper and Loisach many smaller rivers empty into the Isar, such as the Leutasch, the Jachen, the Dürrach, the Dorfen, the Sempt, the Pfettrach and the Gleirschbach. The drainage basin contains some 9,000 square kilometers  (3,500 square miles). During the winter most of the precipitation in the Alps falls as snow. This results in an increased water flow during the spring meltdown. This makes it comparable to other medium-sized rivers in Germany, like the Moselle, Lech or Main.

In 2003 the Isar spring was “developed”, however, this move has been discussed due to environmental reasons. The Lavatschbach, which is the Isar’s longest headstream, has its source farther to the southeast near a mountain cabin named Hallangerhaus. It is also sometimes called the Isar’s head. Further on the young Isar is supplied water by the Birkkarbach, which has its source at the foot of the highest mountain of the Karwendel, the Birkkarspitze and the Moserkarbach.

Having entered Upper Bavaria after ca.  just north of Scharnitz, the Isar is dammed for the first time between Mittenwald and Krün. Some of its waters are led via the Rißbach, whose flowing direction was reversed for this purpose, into the Walchensee. Here it is fed into the giant downpipes of the Walchensee power plant. 200 metres lower the plant releases this part of the water into the Kochelsee. From here it flows into the river Loisach, Isar's second most important tributary. Not far down the river a large reservoir called Sylvensteinsee was created between 1954 and 1959 to make more energy generation possible and also to avoid flooding. It has prevented some bad floods in Munich, for example in 1979, 1999 and most important, in 2005. In that year for the first time ever water had to be released from the lake because its capacity was exhausted. Flooding was barely avoided in Munich, literally 'by the width of one hand'. At Bad Tölz the Isar leaves the Bavarian Alps. This town marks the river's transit from its upper to its middle course.

It now flows through a sub-alpine, glacial morainic landscape towards Wolfratshausen. Just north of the town it absorbs the Loisach, including the water previously drained off for the power plant. The Isar continues on to and through the Munich gravel plain, into which it cuts a narrow, steeply sloped valley. The latter finally opens up and ends within the city limits of Munich. Further downstream the river passes Freising and then absorbs the waters of the Amper, its most important tributary, at Moosburg. This is where its lower course begins.

Passing Landshut, the river makes its way through the Tertiary Hills of Lower Bavaria all the way into the Danube valley.

Islands
Most of the small islands and gravel banks keep changing shape and size due to the annual floods. Some of the islands within the bigger cities were built up during the 19th century and thus protected against the abrasive powers of the water. Among those are the Museumsinsel (on which the Deutsches Museum is located); formerly this island was called Kohleninsel (coal island), the Praterinsel (both located in Munich) and the Mühleninsel in Landshut.

History

It is quite likely that the Isar was used as a trade route, even in prehistoric times, to transport wares from the Alps and even Italy towards the Danube with rafts. An existing trade road from the Inn valley across Seefelder Pass into the northern foothills of the alps was built up and called Via Raetia by the Romans. The town of Mittenwald thus became an important trade post in the Werdenfelser Land.

At a few places the Romans built wooden bridges across the Isara so they could cross the river with its strong currents more easily. One of these could have been along the Roman road from Salzburg to Augsburg south of contemporary Munich. Thus trade traffic could easily be controlled and income from tolls was frequent and regular. The medieval foundation of the cities of Munich and Landshut are directly connected with the building of bridges and the resulting conflicts concerning power and influence on the economy. Due to the continuing growth of the cities there was a constant demand for timber and lime, which resulted in an increase of commercial rafting. Beginning in the 17th century wares like Mediterranean fruit, spices, cotton and silk from the Venetian Market in Mittenwald were transported down the Isar and Danube all the way to Vienna and Budapest. During the 19th century when commercial rafting was at its peak, some 8,000 rafts arrived in Munich each year.
Since the Middle Ages water mills were working at the banks of the Isar by hydro mechanical power. To ensure a more constant flow for the mills the water in Munich was led into small canals. The canals were also used to provide freshwater to the population of the city and also the numerous tanneries of the city and to fill the protecting ditches located outside the medieval town wall. During the annual floodings cities along the Isar were flooded again and again, causing severe damage and even killing people. In 1813 a bridge in Munich collapsed during a flood, killing more than 100 people who were watching the flooding from the bridge. From 1806 on, the banks of the river were fixed and the river was canalized. This led to its deeper digging into the river bed due to its flowing faster. Further extensive measures have been taken since the 1920s to install hydroelectric power plants. From 1954 to 1959 the then much-disputed Sylvensteinspeicher was built for the generation of electricity and for protection against floodings. The village of Fall was drowned in the reservoir. When the water level in the reservoir is very low the church tower can still be seen sticking out of the water. Only over the last few years the Isar was partly turned back from a canal into a more natural river.

At the lower Isar between Moosburg and Plattling gold was washed from the river’s sediments during the 16th and 17th century. However, there was no big economic revenue in this due to the minor amounts of the metal found in the river.

Following their executions on October 16, 1946, the ashes of the convicted Nazi war criminals Joachim von Ribbentrop, Hans Frank, Wilhelm Keitel, Alfred Jodl, Alfred Rosenberg, Ernst Kaltenbrunner, Wilhelm Frick, Arthur Seyss-Inquart, Fritz Sauckel and Julius Streicher were scattered in the Isar, as were those of Hermann Göring who had committed suicide the previous night in defiance of his scheduled execution.

Environmental issues

Since the 1920s the water of the Isar has been used for the generation of electricity. This has had far-reaching consequences not only for the local fauna and flora but also for people. To provide the 28 hydroelectric power plants with enough water power the river’s water is diverted several times and almost the whole river was canalized. For example, just north of Mittenwald all the river’s water was diverted to the lake Walchensee in 1923 for the Walchensee hydroelectric plant. Since 1990 a small portion of the water, 4 cubic meters per second (1100 U.S. gallons per second) is allowed to remain in the river to keep the area from being dry. The construction of the Sylvenstein Dam and numerous regulations relating to the river (pushed through in the early 19th century) have strongly enhanced its character. The construction of the Sylvenstein dam has prevented the river from overflowing its banks.

Lately, there have been attempts to bring the Isar closer back to a natural character. For example, since May, 2000, the river is being re-naturalized in the southern part of the river’s passage through the city of Munich, between Großhesseloher Brücke and Reichenbachbrücke. To achieve this the riverbed is being widened, the banks are flattened and small gravel islands are built along with near-natural ramps to slow the waterflow. Also, the dams are enlarged in width and height.

Besides an improved protection against flooding the river was, thus, brought into an almost natural state and this resulted in an improved quality of the recreational area within the city of Munich. The quality of the water has also improved due to the upgrading of the sewage plants along the river. The number of germs, however, is still relatively high. Together with other cities and communities along the Isar, Munich has set a goal to reduce the number of germs until the water quality is good enough to allow bathing in the river. If this is achieved, Munich would be one of the few big cities in Europe with a river with water of good enough quality to allow swimming in it. The sewer plants on the upper river are now treating the sewage with ultraviolet light, which greatly reduces the number of germs, but still the Isar cannot be guaranteed safe to bathe in because of the entrance of polluted rainwater into the river, especially during strong precipitation.

There are a number of natural reservations along the Isar, including special protection areas for birds, for example the natural reserve Vogelfreistätte Mittlere Isarstauseen northeast of Moosburg. This area is an important resting place for migrating water birds. There has been evidence for more than 260 different species of birds, among them rare species like the common tern and the bluethroat.

To preserve the beauty of the Isar valley Gabriel von Seidl founded the Isartalverein in 1902.

Recreation
There are several areas along the river Isar that have been designated since the 1960s as nudist resorts. However, along much of its banks, even within the city of Munich, people can be seen skinny-dipping wherever they please.

Notes

References

External links

Tourist Information: Sights of Munich (Isar)

 
 
Rivers of Bavaria
Rivers of Tyrol (state)
International rivers of Europe
Rivers of Austria
Rivers of Germany
Braided rivers in Europe